Cavallucci is an Italian surname. Notable people with the surname include:

Antonio Cavallucci (1752–1795), Italian painter
Robert Cavallucci (born 1975), Australian politician

Italian-language surnames